The Dark Kingdom is an organization of antagonists in the Sailor Moon metaseries.

Dark Kingdom may also refer to:

 Dark Kingdom arc, the corresponding Sailor Moon first-season story arc
 Dark Kingdom: The Dragon King, a 2004 fantasy film and mini-series
 Untold Legends: Dark Kingdom, a 2006 hack and slash video game
 Dark Kingdom, a 1994 role-playing video game
 Dark Kingdom (professional wrestling), a professional wrestling stable